The Russian Gyroplanes Gyros-1 Farmer is a Russian autogyro designed and produced by Russian Gyroplanes of Zhukovsky, Moscow Oblast. The aircraft is supplied complete and ready-to-fly.

Design and development
The Gyros-1 was designed for aerial work use, including aerial application, courier, forestry patrol, search and rescue and geological survey. It features a single main rotor, a single-seat enclosed cockpit accessed by a door, tricycle landing gear, plus a tailwheel and a  Eggenfellner E6 Suburu-based, automotive conversion, six cylinder, four-stroke, horizontally-opposed, liquid-cooled, gasoline engine in tractor configuration.

The aircraft also fits an optional Racket 120 single-cylinder, two-stroke auxiliary engine for running the agricultural equipment, when installed.

The aircraft fuselage includes a baggage compartment or application hopper between the cockpit and the nose-mounted engine. It has a two-bladed rotor and a four-bladed propeller.

Specifications (Gyros-1)

See also
List of rotorcraft
Russian Gyroplanes Gyros-2 Smartflier

References

External links

Official website

Gyros-1
2000s Russian civil utility aircraft
Single-engined tractor autogyros
Twin-tail aircraft